Kelly LeBrock (born ) is an American actress and model. Her acting debut was in The Woman in Red (1984), alongside Gene Wilder. She also starred in the John Hughes film Weird Science (1985), and in Hard to Kill (1990), opposite Steven Seagal.

Early life
Kelly LeBrock was born in New York City, and was brought up in the upscale Kensington area of London. Her father was French-Canadian, and her mother, Maria, is British.  LeBrock was named after her grandmother, Mary Helen Kelly, from Keady, County Armagh, who married John Traynor.

Career

Modeling
LeBrock began her career as a model at age 16 in her adopted city of New York. Her breakthrough came at 19, when she starred in a 24-page spread in Vogue magazine. Shortly afterwards, she entered into a contract with Christian Dior to work for that fashion label for 30 days a year. She subsequently appeared on numerous magazine covers and in fashion spreads, and became one of Eileen Ford's most sought-after models. She became especially recognizable as the Pantene shampoo commercial spokeswoman whose line, "Don't hate me because I'm beautiful", became a pop culture catchphrase.

Film
LeBrock was cast as the "perfect" or "fantasy" woman in the films The Woman in Red (1984) and Weird Science (1985). As a result, she was considered one of the sexiest women in Hollywood in the 1980s, and was in high demand, but took a hiatus from acting until 1990.   Her return to the big screen started in 1990 when she starred opposite her then-husband, Steven Seagal, in Hard to Kill. LeBrock also appeared in Betrayal of the Dove (1993), Tracks of a Killer (1995), and Hard Bounty (1995).

She had roles in the films Wrongfully Accused (1998), The Sorcerer's Apprentice (2001), Zerophilia (2005), and Gamers: The Movie (2006). LeBrock was in a thriller entitled Hidden Affairs, released in 2013, and in 2015 she appeared in A Prince for Christmas as Queen Ariana.

Television
In 2005, LeBrock was the captain of the team "Kelly's Bellies" on VH1's Celebrity Fit Club reality show. She also appeared on the third UK series of Hell's Kitchen. She and her daughter Arissa were featured on the Lifetime docuseries Growing Up Supermodel which debuted in August 2017.

In popular culture
British band Bastille released the song "Good Grief" in 2016, which samples two of LeBrock's phrases from Weird Science: "So what would you little maniacs like to do first?" and "If you want to be a party animal, you have to learn to live in the jungle. Now stop worrying and go and get dressed."

Personal life

Her first marriage was to film producer and restaurateur Victor Drai, in 1984; they divorced in 1986. During this time she met actor and martial artist Steven Seagal. Their daughter Annaliza was born in spring 1987 and the couple married in September of that year. Their son Dominic was born in June 1990 and their daughter Arissa in 1993. The following year, LeBrock filed for divorce, citing "irreconcilable differences".

In July 2007, LeBrock married retired investment banker Fred Steck and divorced him the next year. As of 2011, LeBrock lives on a ranch in California's Santa Ynez Valley.

After the death of her brother Harold in 2008, LeBrock began devoting time to the terminally ill. She has been a spokeswoman for Club Carson, whose members are children suffering from cancer.

Filmography
 1984 The Woman in Red as Charlotte
 1985 Weird Science as Lisa
 1990 Hard to Kill as Andrea 'Andy' Stewart
 1993 Betrayal of the Dove as Una
 1993 David Copperfield (TV) as Clara (voice)
 1995 Tracks of a Killer as Claire Hawkner
 1995 Hard Bounty as Donnie
 1998 Wrongfully Accused as Lauren Goodhue
 2001 The Sorcerer's Apprentice (2001 film) as Morgana
 2005 Zerophilia (2005) as woman in RV
 2006 Gamers: The Movie as Angela's Mom
 2007 The Mirror as Mary Theophilu
 2009 Prep School as Miss Waters
 2015 10 Days in a Madhouse as Miss Grant
 2015 A Prince for Christmas as Queen Ariana
 2019 Charlie Boy as Donna

References

External links

Living people
20th-century American actresses
21st-century American actresses
Actresses from New York City
American emigrants to England
American film actresses
American people of French-Canadian descent
American people of Irish descent
20th-century English actresses
21st-century English actresses
English film actresses
English people of French-Canadian descent
English people of Irish descent
Female models from New York (state)
Steven Seagal
Year of birth missing (living people)